A Story of David is a 1961 British-Israeli drama film directed by Bob McNaught and starring Jeff Chandler, Basil Sydney and Peter Arne. It depicts the life of the Biblical King David and his conflicted relationship with King Saul.

It was one of the first films made for television.

Plot
Saul becomes jealous of the popularity of his protege David and tries to kill him. David goes into hiding.

Cast
 Jeff Chandler - David 
 Basil Sydney - King Saul 
 Peter Arne - Doeg 
 David Knight - Jonathan 
 Barbara Shelley - Abigail 
 Donald Pleasence - Nabal 
 Richard O'Sullivan - Abiathar 
 Robert Brown - Jashobeam 
 David Davies - Abner 
 Angela Browne - Michal 
 John Van Eyssen - Joab 
 Martin Wyldeck - Hezro 
 Charles Carson - Ahimilech 
 Zena Marshall - Naomi 
 Alec Mango - Kudruh 
 Peter Madden - Chief Herder

Production
The film was a co-production between ABC-TV and William Goetz. It was shot in Israel and London.  It was intended that the film be released as two one-hour episodes for TV in the US and as a feature in other countries. Part one was to be called David the Outlaw; part two David the Hunted.

"It's a simple story," said Chandler "only half a dozen people in it. There'll be no chariot race." Filming took place in Israel in August and September 1960; Israel troops guarded them near the Jordan border. The unit then shifted to Elstree studios in London. Filming had completed by October.

During filming Chandler met David Ben Gurion.

Release
ABC could not find a sponsor for the program. It eventually screened on ABC as a Sunday night movie in 1962. The film drew record high ratings and prompted ABC to commission a series Great Bible Stories.

References

External links
 
A Story of David at Letterbox DVD

1961 drama films
1961 films
British drama films
Films shot at Associated British Studios
Israeli drama films
Films about David
Films set in the 11th century BC
Films set in Jerusalem
1960s English-language films
1960s British films